Tobii AB (formerly known as Tobii Technology AB) is a Swedish high-technology company that develops and sells products for eye tracking and attention computing.

History 

Founded in 2001, Tobii is a developer of eye tracking solutions for use in scientific research, extended reality headsets, commercial devices, and custom-built machines. Tobii is based in Stockholm, Sweden, with offices in the US, Japan, China, Germany, Norway, and Ukraine. Tobii became publicly traded on April 22, 2015, on the Nasdaq Stockholm. The company was founded by John Elvesjo, Mårten Skogö, and Henrik Eskilsson who handed over the CEO role to Anand Srivatsa toward the end of 2021. In April of 2022, Tobii officially merged the Tobii Group, and two of its former three business units Tobii Pro and Tobii Tech into a single entity Tobii AB. The third business unit, Tobii Dynavox, a previous acquisition of US based DynaVox, was spun off in October 2021.

In 2008, Tobii won the Swedish Grand Award of Design together with the design company Myra Industrial Design, for the technology and design in their eye controlled screens. In 2010, Tobii won the SIME Grand Prize for having the most innovative technology concept. In 2011, Tobii Glasses won the red dot design award, an international product design competition and later the same year, Tobii won the Bully Award. In 2012, Tobii took home the award for best prototype at the consumer technology trade show 2012 CES, and Laptop Magazine named Tobii the winner in its best new technology category.

Products
Tobii's product portfolio contains a range of eye trackers, integration platforms, and related data-analysis software and development kits for use in scientific research, gaming, and marketing and consumer insights. Tobii sells its products directly and through a global reseller network. 

Owing to the connection between eye movements and cognitive function Tobii's products are widely used by scientific researchers in a range of fields including psychology, neuroscience, and visual perception. Eye tracking is used by consumer retail businesses to assess the efficiency of store layouts for example, product placement, and advertising. Tobii's integration platforms are suitable for embedding in commercial devices like PCs and XR headsets, as well as industry applications and fields such as advanced driver monitoring, consumer computing and gaming.

References

External links
 

Cognitive science
Companies based in Stockholm
Companies established in 2001
Technology companies of Sweden
Vision